Jonathan Shepard is a British historian specialising in early medieval Russia, the Caucasus, and the Byzantine Empire. He is regarded as a leading authority in Byzantine studies and on the Kievan Rus. He specialises in diplomatic and archaeological history of the early Kievan period. Shepard received his doctorate in 1973 from Oxford University and was a lecturer in Russian History at the University of Cambridge. Among other works, he is co-author (with Simon Franklin) of The Emergence of Rus 750–1200 (1996), and editor of The Cambridge History of the Byzantine Empire (2008).

Among Shepard's theories is that the breakdown in Byzantine-Khazar relations and the shift in Byzantine foreign policy towards allying with the Pechenegs and the Rus against Khazaria was a result of the Khazar conversion to Judaism.

Selected bibliography

As author
Shepard, Jonathan (1998) "The Khazars' Formal Adoption of Judaism and Byzantium's Northern Policy" in: Oxford Slavonic Papers; 1998
Shepard, Jonathan (1997) "Byzantine Soldiers, Missionaries, and Diplomacy under Gibbon's Eyes" in  Rosamund McKitterick and Roland Quinault, eds. Edward Gibbon and Empire, Cambridge: U. P., 1997
Franklin, Simon; Shepard, Jonathan (1996) The Emergence of Rus, 750-1200. London and New York: Longman.
Shepard, Jonathan (1992) "A Suspected Source of John Scylitzes' Synopsis Historion: the great Catacalon Cecaumenus" in: Byzantine and modern Greek studies.
Shepard, Jonathan (1975–76) "Scylitzes on Armenia in the 1040s and the role of Catacalon Cecaumenus." Revue des Études Arméniennes, N.S. 11, pp. 269–311.

As editor
Shepard, Jonathan, et al., eds. (2008). The Cambridge History of the Byzantine Empire. Cambridge University Press.
Shepard, Jonathan; Franklin, Simon, eds. (1992) Byzantine Diplomacy: papers of the Twenty-fourth Spring Symposium of Byzantine Studies, Cambridge, March 1990. Aldershot; Brookfield, Vt.: Variorum.

Notes

References

British historians
Khazar studies
Living people
Year of birth missing (living people)
Scholars of Byzantine history